Trần Hưng Đạo (1228–1300), real name Trần Quốc Tuấn (陳國峻), also known as Grand Prince Hưng Đạo (Hưng Đạo Đại Vương - 興道大王), was a Vietnamese royal prince, statesman and military commander of Đại Việt military forces during the Trần dynasty, after his death, he was considered a god by the people and named Đức Thánh Trần (德聖陳) or Cửu Thiên Vũ Đế (九天武帝). Hưng Đạo commanded the Vietnamese armies that repelled two out of three major Mongol invasions in late 13th century. His multiple victories over the Yuan dynasty under Kublai Khan is considered among the greatest military feats in Vietnamese history.

Origins
Trần Hưng Đạo was born as Prince Trần Quốc Tuấn (陳國峻) in 1228 to Prince Trần Liễu, the elder brother of the new child emperor, Trần Thái Tông, after the Trần dynasty replaced the Lý family in 1225 AD. Later, Trần Liễu—the Empress Lý Chiêu Hoàng's brother-in-law at the time—was forced to defer his own wife (Princess Thuận Thiên) to his younger brother Emperor Thái Tông under pressure from Imperial Regent Trần Thủ Độ to solidify Trần clan's dynastic stability. The brothers Trần Liễu and Emperor Trần Thái Tông harboured grudges against their uncle Trần Thủ Độ for the forced marital arrangement.

Trần Quốc Tuấn, his father Trần Liễu, and Emperor Trần Thái Tông had a very close relationship. Liễu would find great tutors to teach his son, Trần Quốc Tuấn, with the hope of one day becoming a great leader of Đại Việt and regain his family honour. On his deathbed, Liễu told his son to avenge what he felt was personal shame forced upon him and his brother, Trần Thái Tông, by the Imperial Regent Tran Thu Do.

First Mongol invasion

During the first Mongol invasion of Vietnam in 1258, Trần Hưng Đạo served as an officer commanding troops on the frontier.

Second Mongol invasion

In 1285, Kublai Khan demanded passage through Đại Việt for his Yuan army to invade the Kingdom of Champa (in modern-day central Vietnam). When the Đại Việt government refused, the Mongol army, led by Prince Toghan, attacked Đại Việt and captured the imperial capital Thăng Long (modern day Hanoi). The Emperor Emeritus Trần Thánh Tông and Emperor Trần Nhân Tông appointed Trần Hưng Đạo as the Commander-in-chief of the armies (Quốc công tiết chế thống lĩnh chư quân). The prince of Hưng Đạo initially built defensive lines in the frontier areas, but those were rapidly broken by Toghan's armies. It was in that episode that his loyal servant, Yết Kiêu, saved him from being nearly captured by the Mongols. Then he retreated to Vạn Kiếp, where he had a discussion with Emperor Trần Nhân Tông. The two agreed to call 200.000 troops from north-east areas to assemble in Vạn Kiếp. Here, on 11 February 1285, Viet navy under the direct commander of the emperor and the prince of Hưng Đạo fought a huge battle with Toghan's fleet. The Yuan fleet suffered heavily but they managed to win the battle. Emperor Trần Nhân Tông and Prince of Hưng Đạo eventually retreated to the imperial capital, Thăng Long. The Yuan forces pursued to Thăng Long and broke its defenses; however, the prince of Hưng Đạo's troops kept the enemy at bay long enough for the two emperors to escape from the city with the imperial family and the bulk of the army. The prince of Hưng Đạo and other generals escorted the royal family, staying just ahead of the Mongol army in hot pursuit. The Yuan army effectively controlled most of Annam, and surrounded the remaining Dai Viet leadership on land; however the latter fled to an island. Despite their martial success, the Yuan forces struggled greatly with heat and disease. As a result, the Yuan forces again retreated to wait until colder weather. Then Viet forces, divided into field armies commanded by the two emperors; Grand Chancellor Trần Quang Khải, Grand Prince of Chiêu Minh; Trần Nhật Duật, Prince of Chiêu Văn; and Trần Quốc Tuấn, Prince of Hưng Đạo conducted highly effective counterattacks, killing many Yuan generals like Sogetu.

Third Mongol invasion

In 1287, Kublai Khan this time sent one of his favorite sons, Prince Toghan to lead another invasion campaign into Đại Việt with a determination to occupy and redeem the previous defeat. The Yuan Mongol and Chinese forces formed an even larger infantry, cavalry and naval fleet with the total strength estimated at 120.000 troops according to the Mongols and 500.000 men according to the Vietnamese [but when it comes to the Mongols number, the Mongols will be more precisely since they need the precision in order to prepare food].

During the first stage of the invasion, the Mongols quickly defeated most of the Đại Việt troops that were stationed along the border. Prince Toghan's naval fleet devastated most of the naval force of General Trần Khánh Dư in Vân Đồn. Simultaneously, Prince Ariq-Qaya led his massive cavalry and captured Phú Lương and Đại Than garrisons, two strategic military posts bordering Đại Việt and China. The cavalry later rendezvous with Prince Toghan's navy in Vân Đồn. In response to the battle skirmish defeats at the hands of the Mongol forces, the Emperor Emeritus Trần Thánh Tông summoned General Trần Khánh Dư to be court-martialed for military failures, but the general managed to delay reporting to the court and was able to regroup his forces in Vân Đồn. The cavalry and fleet of Prince Toghan continued to advance into the imperial capital Thăng Long. Meanwhile, the trailing supply fleet of Prince Toghan, arriving at Vân Đồn a few days after General Trần Khánh Dư's had already occupied this strategic garrison, the Mongol supply fleet was ambushed and captured by General Trần Khánh Dư's forces. Khánh Dư was then pardoned by Emperor Emeritus. The Mongol main occupying army quickly realized their support and supply fleet has been cut off.

The capture of the Mongol supply fleet at Vân Đồn along with the concurring news that General Trần Hưng Đạo had recaptured Đại Than garrison in the north sent the fast advancing Mongol forces into chaos. The Đại Việt forces unleashed guerrilla warfare on the weakened Mongol forces causing heavy casualties and destructions to the Yuan forces. However, the Mongols continued advancing into Thăng Long due to their massive cavalry strength, but by this time, the emperor decided to vacate Thăng Long to flee and he ordered the capital to be burned down so the Mongols wouldn't collect any spoils of war. The subsequent battle skirmishes between the Mongols and Đại Việt had mixed results: the Mongols won and captured Yên Hưng and Long Hưng provinces, but lost in the naval battles at Đại Bàng. Eventually, Prince Toghan decided to withdraw his naval fleet and consolidate his command on land battles where he felt the Mongol's superior cavalry would defeat the Đại Việt infantry and cavalry forces. Toghan led the cavalry through Nội Bàng while his naval fleet commander, Omar, directly launched the naval force along the Bạch Đằng River simultaneously.

The Battle of Bạch Đằng River

The Mongol naval fleet was unaware of the river's terrain. Days before this expedition, the Prince of Hưng Đạo predicted the Mongol's naval route and quickly deployed heavy unconventional traps of steel-tipped wooden stakes unseen during high tides along the Bạch Đằng River bed. When Omar ordered the Mongol fleet to retreat from the river, the Viet deployed smaller and more maneuverable vessels into agitating and luring the Mongol vessels into the riverside where the booby traps were waiting while it was still high tide. As the river tide on Bạch Đằng River receded, the Mongol vessels were stuck and sunk by the embedded steel-tipped stakes. Under the presence of the Emperor Emeritus Thánh Tông and Emperor Nhân Tông, the Viet forces led by the Prince of Hưng Đạo burned down an estimated 400 large Mongol vessels and captured the remaining naval crew along the river. The entire Mongol fleet was destroyed and the Mongol fleet admiral Omar was captured.

The cavalry force of Prince Toghan was more fortunate. They were ambushed along the road through Nội Bàng, but his remaining force managed to escape back to China by dividing their forces into smaller retreating groups but most were captured or killed in skirmishes on the way back to the border frontier.

Death

In 1300 AD, he fell ill and died of natural causes at the age of 73. His body was cremated and his ashes were dispersed under his favorite oak tree he planted in his royal family estate near Thăng Long in accordance to his will. The Viet intended to bury him in a lavish royal mausoleum and official ceremony upon his death, but he declined in favour of a simplistic private ceremony. For his military brilliance in defending Đại Việt during his lifetime, the Emperor posthumously bestowed Trần Hưng Đạo the title of Hưng Đạo Đại Vương (Grand Prince Hưng Đạo).

Family 
Father: Prince Yên Sinh
Mother: Lady Thiện Đạo
Consort: Princess Thiên Thành
Issues:
, later Prince Hưng Vũ
, later Prince Hưng Trí
Trần Quốc Tảng, later Prince Hưng Nhượng, father of Empress Consort Bảo Từ of Emperor Trần Anh Tông 
, later Prince Hưng Hiếu
Trần Thị Trinh, later Empress Consort Khâm Từ Bảo Thánh of Emperor Trần Nhân Tông
Empress Tuyên Từ
Princess Anh Nguyên, later wife of General Phạm Ngũ Lão

Legacy

Placenames
The majority of cities and towns in Vietnam have central streets, wards and schools named after him.
 Hanoi's Tran Hung Dao street (previously Boulevard Gambetta during the French Indochina time) is a major road in the south of Hoan Kiem District. It links the city's First Ring Road (originally Route Circulaire) to the main hall of the Central Station.
 Hai Phong's Tran Hung Dao road runs along the central park square and links the Haiphong Opera House and the Cấm River.
 Da Nang's Tran Hung Dao road is a waterfront boulevard on the eastern side of the Hàn River.
 Ho Chi Minh City's Tran Hung Dao road is a thoroughfare of its Chinatown. It also hosts the headquarters of the city police and fire departments. A statue in honor of him is placed at a major roundabout at city downtown.
 A statue in Westminster, CA is dedicated to him, with the road Bolsa Avenue given an alternative name "Đại Lộ Trần Hưng Đạo", translating to "Trần Hưng Đạo Boulevard".

Shrines

He is revered by the Vietnamese people as a national hero. Several shrines are dedicated to him, and even religious belief and mediumship includes belief in him as a god, Đức Thánh Trần (Tín ngưỡng Đức Thánh Trần).

See also

Trần dynasty
History of Vietnam
Mongol invasions of Vietnam
Trần dynasty military tactics and organization
Proclamation to the Officers

References

Bibliography
 Taylor, K. W. (2013). A History of the Vietnamese (illustrated ed.). Cambridge University Press. . Retrieved 7 August 2013.
 Hall, Kenneth R., ed. (2008). Secondary Cities and Urban Networking in the Indian Ocean Realm, C. 1400-1800. Volume 1 of Comparative urban studies. Lexington Books. . Retrieved 7 August 2013.

External links

 TRAN HUNG DAO (1213-1300)
 Statue of Trần Hưng Đạo, Vietnamese Hero, 19th-20th. C.
  Le Vietnam et la stratégie du faible au fort
 Call of Soldiers Translated and adapted by George F. Schultz

1228 births
1300 deaths
13th-century conflicts
Trần dynasty generals
Vietnamese military writers
Deified Vietnamese people
Trần dynasty writers
Vietnamese deities
Vietnamese gods